The 1909–10 Cincinnati Bearcats men's basketball team represented the University of Cincinnati during the 1909–10 college men's basketball season. The head coach was C.A. Schroetter, coaching his first season with the Bearcats.

Schedule

|-

References

Cincinnati Bearcats men's basketball seasons
Cincinnati Bearcats men's basketball team
Cincinnati Bearcats men's basketball team
Cincinnati Bearcats men's basketball team